St. Gertrude's Cathedral (Dutch: Sint-Gertrudiskathedraal) in Utrecht, the Netherlands, is the seat of the Archbishop of Utrecht and the mother church of the Old Catholic Church of the Netherlands (and of the wider Old Catholic Communion).

It is located at Willemsplantsoen, at the edge of the city centre.

In the altar there are more than 1700 relics in hundreds of containers. Underneath these relics there is supposed to be a piece of a rib of St. Willibrord.

St. Gertrude's Chapel

The predecessor to the current building, called St. Gertrude's Chapel (Dutch: Gertrudiskapel), has been preserved, and is attached to the current cathedral. It was built in 1634 within a mediaeval house as a clandestine church for the members of the Roman Catholic parish of the Geertekerk (nl) (the original St. Gertrude's Church, now in the possession of the Remonstrants).

See also
Old Catholic Church
Union of Utrecht (Old Catholic)

References

External links

Website of St. Gertrude's Cathedral and the Old Catholic parish of Utrecht "In de Driehoek" (Dutch)

Old Catholic church buildings
Churches in Utrecht (city)
Cathedrals in the Netherlands
Churches completed in 1914
Catholicism in the Netherlands
Catholic cathedrals in Europe
20th-century churches in the Netherlands